Muhlenbergia dumosa, commonly known as the bamboo muhly, is a species of grass native to Arizona and California.

References

dumosa
Garden plants of North America
Grasses of the United States